Capillariasis is a disease caused by nematodes in the genus Capillaria. The two principal forms of the disease are:
 Intestinal capillariasis, caused by Capillaria philippinensis
 Hepatic capillariasis, caused by Capillaria hepatica

References

Helminthiases